Old Richmond Township is one of fifteen townships in Forsyth County, North Carolina, United States. The township had a population of 5,236 according to the 2010 census.

Geographically, Old Richmond Township occupies  in northwestern Forsyth County.  The village of Tobaccoville, North Carolina is located here as well as the unincorporated community of Donnaha.  The township fronts the Yadkin River on its western boundary.

A site near Donnaha in Old Richmond Township was briefly the 18th century county seat of a much larger Surry County that once encompassed the area.

References

Townships in Forsyth County, North Carolina
Townships in North Carolina